The Helen Lookingbill Site is a prehistoric campsite in the Absaroka Mountains of Fremont County, Wyoming. Occupied over 12,500 years, the site has yielded more than 125,000 artifacts, including a large quantity of Early Plains Archaic side-notched points. The site has been assessed as a tool production location. 

The site was placed on the National Register of Historic Places on March 30, 2013.

References

External links
 Helen Lookingbill Site at the Wyoming State Historic Preservation Office

		
National Register of Historic Places in Fremont County, Wyoming
Archaeological sites on the National Register of Historic Places in Wyoming